Jeremy Stevenson (born 8 December 1986) is an Australian rower. He competed in the men's eight event at the 2008 Summer Olympics.

References

External links
 

1986 births
Living people
Australian male rowers
Olympic rowers of Australia
Rowers at the 2008 Summer Olympics
People from Karratha, Western Australia
21st-century Australian people